Reema is a given name, and may refer to:
 Reema Abdo (born 1963), Yemen-born Canadian backstroke swimmer who competed in the 1984 Summer Olympics
 Reema Juffali (born 1992), Saudi Arabian racing driver
 Reema Kagti (born 1972), Indian film director and screenwriter
 Reema Khan (active from 1990), Pakistani film actress and producer, often billed as "Reema"
 Reema Lagoo (born 1958), Indian Hindi and Marathi film and television actress
 Reema Lamba (screen name Mallika Sherawat, born 1976), Indian actress who works in Hindi, English and Chinese language films
 Reema Major (born 1995), Sudan-born Canadian rapper
 Reema Malhotra (born 1980), Indian international cricketer 
 Reema Nagra (active from 2013), Canadian Punjabi-speaking actress and producer
 Reema Rakesh Nath (active 1995), Indian film writer, director and producer
 Reema Sen (born 1981), Indian actress in Tamil and Telugu films

In fiction
Reema, a character played by Rameet Kaur in the British web series Corner Shop Show.